Grootebroek is a town in the Dutch province of North Holland. It is located in the municipality of Stede Broec.

Grootebroek was a separate municipality until 1979.
The town is called Grootebroek after a large swamp in the area; in Dutch, "groote" means "large" and "broek" means "swamp". The most common meaning of "broek" in present-day Dutch is "pants", leading to some  hilarity about the town's name. Grootebroek is located next to Lutjebroek, "small swamp".

The Dutch football players Frank and Ronald de Boer grew up in Grootebroek.

References

Populated places in North Holland
Former municipalities of North Holland
Stede Broec